Gurman is a surname and given name. Notable people with the surname or given name include:

Surname
Aleksey Gurman (born 1978), Kazakhstani diver
Jamie Gillis (1943-2010), born Jamey Gurman, American pornographic actor and director 
Mark Gurman (born 1989), Kazakhstani professional association football player
Nafiz Gürman (1882-1966), Turkish general and military officer
Öykü Gürman (born 1982), Turkish singer and actress

Given name
Gurman Randhawa (born 1992), English cricketer